{{Infobox boxing match
| fight date    = September 17, 2011
| Fight Name    = Star Power
| image         = 
| location      = MGM Grand Garden Arena, Paradise, Nevada, U.S.
| fighter2      =  Victor Ortiz
| nickname2    = Vicious
| record2  = 29–2–2 (22 KO)
| hometown2     = Oxnard, California, U.S.
| height1      = 5 ft 8 in.
| weight1       = 146+1/2 lb
| recognition2 = WBC welterweight champion
| fighter1  = Floyd Mayweather Jr.
| nickname1     = Money
| record1 = 41–0 (25 KO)
| hometown1     = Las Vegas, Nevada, U.S.
| height2       = 5 ft 9 in.
| weight2       = 147 lb
| recognition1  = [[The Ring (magazine)|The Ring]] No. 2 ranked pound-for-pound fighter5-division world champion
| titles        = WBC welterweight title
| result        =  Mayweather Jr. wins via 4th-round KO
}}

Floyd Mayweather Jr. vs. Victor Ortiz, billed as Star Power'', was a championship fight for Ortiz's WBC welterweight title. The bout was held on September 17, 2011, at the MGM Grand in Paradise, Nevada, Nevada and televised via HBO PPV. As a part of a split-site doubleheader, the broadcast also featured the Saul Alvarez vs. Alfonso Gomez light middleweight championship bout taking place at the Staples Center in Los Angeles, California.

The fight

From round one, Mayweather used his speed, skills and accurate right hand to tag Ortiz repeatedly. Mayweather seemed in control through the first three rounds (judges scores: 30–27, 30–27, 29–28 for Mayweather), but in the fourth round, Ortiz found some success, landing a few shots and stinging Mayweather before backing him into the corner. Ortiz hit Mayweather in the face with an apparently intentional headbutt, busting open a cut on the inside and outside of Mayweather's mouth. Referee Joe Cortez immediately called timeout and penalised Ortiz a point for the foul. Ortiz, seemingly acknowledging his wrongdoing, hugged and kissed Mayweather in the corner. Cortez motioned the fighters back together to resume the fight. The fighters touched gloves and Mayweather seemed to half-heartedly return another hug from Ortiz.  Then, with Cortez looking away from Mayweather, and as the fighters separated from the hug, Mayweather caught Ortiz with a left hook.  Ortiz was stunned by the punch and, still not raising his hands to defend himself, was hit with a flush right to the face.  Ortiz dropped straight onto the canvas and was unable to beat Cortez's count.

"In the ring, you have to protect yourself at all times," Mayweather said. "After it happened, we touched gloves and we were back to fighting and then I threw the left hook and right hand after the break. You just gotta protect yourself at all times." Mayweather then told interviewer Larry Merchant that he should be fired and shouted many expletives at him after Larry Merchant asked if what he did was unsportsmanlike.

Fight earnings

Mayweather was paid a guaranteed $25 million, which could have gone as high as $40 million depending on the pay per view numbers, and Ortiz was paid $2 million.

Mayweather vs. Victor Ortiz generated buys from 1.25 million homes with a value of $78,440,000 in pay-per-view revenue. These numbers make the event the third highest grossing non-heavyweight pay-per-view event of all time.

Main card
Welterweight Championship bout  Floyd Mayweather Jr. vs.  Victor Ortiz
Mayweather defeats Ortiz via Knockout at 2:59 of the fourth round
Light Welterweight Championship bout  Erik Morales vs.  Pablo César Cano
Morales defeats Cano via Technical Knockout at 3:00 of the tenth round.
Light Welterweight bout  Jessie Vargas vs.  Josésito López
Vargas defeated López via Split Decision (95–94, 94–95, 96–93)

Preliminary card
Welterweight bout  Carson Jones vs  Said Ouali
Jones defeats Ouali via Technical Knockout (Retirement) at 3:00 of the seventh round.
Super Middleweight bout  Adonis Stevenson vs.  Dion Savage
Stevenson defeats Savage via Technical Knockout at 1:57 of the first round.
Super Middleweight bout  Marco Antonio Periban vs.  Dhafir Smith
Periban defeats Jones via Unanimous Decision. (80–72, 79–73, 79–73)
Lightweight bout  Anthony Crolla vs.  Juan Montiel
Crolla defeats Montiel via Split Decision. (78–74, 77–75, 75–77)

International broadcasting

References

Boxing matches involving Floyd Mayweather Jr.
2011 in boxing
Boxing in Las Vegas
2011 in sports in Nevada
Boxing on HBO
Golden Boy Promotions
September 2011 sports events in the United States
MGM Grand Garden Arena
Events in Paradise, Nevada